Aeginura grimaldii is a species of deep sea hydrozoan of the family Aeginidae. It is found in the north-eastern Atlantic Ocean, Pacific Ocean, and the Arctic Ocean. It has a depth range of 660-1200m deep. Live specimens are bright reddish in color, with pale tentacles, and a light red globous capsule dome containing the dark colored red body. It usually measures no more than 4.5cm  from the peak of the bell to the end of the tentacles.

References

 Vanhöffen, E., 1908. Die Narcomedusen. Wiss. Erg. dt. Tiefsee-Exped. Valdivia 19 : 41-74
 Land, J.; Vervoort, W.; Cairns, S.D.; Schuchert, P. (2001). Hydrozoa, in: Costello, M.J. et al. (Ed.) (2001). European register of marine species: a check-list of the marine species in Europe and a bibliography of guides to their identification. Collection Patrimoines Naturels, 50: pp. 112–120
 Navas-Pereira, D. & M. Vannucci (1991). The Hydromedusae and water masses of the Indian Ocean. Bolm Inst. Oceanogr., S. Paulo. 39(1): 25-60
 Segura-Puertas, L., L. Celis, and L. Chiaverano. 2009. Medusozoans (Cnidaria: Cubozoa, Scyphozoa, and Hydrozoa) of the Gulf of Mexico, Pp. 369–379 in Felder, D.L. and D.K. Camp (eds.), Gulf of Mexico–Origins, Waters, and Biota. Biodiversity. Texas A&M Pre
 Chen, Q. C. (1982). The marine zooplankton of Hong Kong. In: Morton B, editor. Proceedings of the first international marine biological workshop: The marine flora and fauna of Hong Kong and southern China. Hong Kong University Press, Hong Kong. 2: 789-799

External links
 Maas O. (1904b). Méduses provenant des campagnes des yachts Hirondelle et princesse Alice. (1886-1903). Résultats des campagnes scientifiques accomplies sur son yacht par Albert Ier, Prince Souverain de Monaco. 28: 1-71, 6 plates
 Mayer, A. G. 1910. Medusae of the world. Hydromedusae, Vols. I & II. Scyphomedusae, Vol III. Carnegie Institution, Washington. pp. 735, plates 1-76
 Maas O. (1905c). Die Craspedoten Medusen der Siboga-Expeditie. Siboga Expeditie. 10: 1-84, pls 1-14
  Cairns, S.D.; Gershwin, L.; Brook, F.J.; Pugh, P.; Dawson, E.W.; Ocaña O.V.; Vervoort, W.; Williams, G.; Watson, J.E.; Opresko, D.M.; Schuchert, P.; Hine, P.M.; Gordon, D.P.; Campbell, H.J.; Wright, A.J.; Sánchez, J.A.; Fautin, D.G. (2009). Phylum Cnidaria: corals, medusae, hydroids, myxozoans. in: Gordon, D.P. (Ed.) (2009). New Zealand inventory of biodiversity: 1. Kingdom Animalia: Radiata, Lophotrochozoa, Deuterostomia. pp. 59-101

Aeginidae
Animals described in 1904